Siren Charms is the eleventh studio album by Swedish heavy metal band In Flames. It was released on 5 September 2014 and 9 September in the United States via Sony Music Entertainment. Siren Charms is the first album to feature guitarist Niclas Engelin and the last album to feature long time drummer Daniel Svensson before his departure in 2015.

The eighth track on the disc, "Rusted Nail", was the album's lead single, released on 13 June 2014. Shortly after this release, the band briefly streamed a second track, "Through Oblivion", online. On 9 September 2014, In Flames released an additional music video for the song "Everything's Gone". Finally, a video for "Paralyzed" was released on 15 February 2015.

Critical reception

Siren Charms received generally mixed reviews from music critics. At Metacritic, which assigns a normalized rating out of 100 to reviews from critics, the album received an average score of 52, which indicates "mixed or average reviews", based on 4 reviews. Gregory Heaney of AllMusic described Siren Charms as "a bit too casual". However he stated it as "a solidly written and executed metal album" and that fans of the band's latest material will likely enjoy it. Kyle Ward of Sputnikmusic however panned the album, describing it as "an unforgivable misstep containing oversights in both songwriting and execution that such a veteran band should be able to spot and correct."

Track listing

Personnel
In Flames
Anders Fridén – vocals
Björn Gelotte – lead guitar
Niclas Engelin – rhythm guitar
Peter Iwers – bass
Daniel Svensson – drums

Additional musicians
Örjan Örnkloo – keyboards, programming
Emilia Feldt – backing vocals on "When the World Explodes"
The Head Jester Choir – choir on "Rusted Nail"
Martin Rubashov – backing vocals on "Dead Eyes"

Other personnel
 Erik Jaime – art direction
 Andreas Werling – art direction, design, management
 Blake Armstrong – artwork, illustration
 In Flames – co-production
 Arnold Lindberg – additional drum editing
 Roberto Laghi – engineering, production
 Daniel Bergstrand – engineering, production, backing vocals
 Jez Hale – management
 Tom Coyne – mastering
 Michael Ilbert – mixing

Charts

References

External links
 

2014 albums
In Flames albums
Sony Music albums